Horam railway station was on the Cuckoo Line between Hellingly and Heathfield, serving the village of Horam.

History
The station was opened by the London, Brighton and South Coast Railway on 5 April 1880 and was originally named Horeham Road for Waldron. It was on the line extension from Hailsham to Eridge. It was renamed several times: on 1 June 1890 it became Horeham Road and Waldron; on 1 April 1900 Waldron and Horeham Road; on 1 January 1935 Waldron and Horam; and it finally became Horam on 21 September 1953.

The station closed to passenger traffic on 14 June 1965 but freight trains continued to pass through until 1968 when the line was closed completely.

Present day

The Cuckoo Trail foot and cycle path runs over one of the platforms. Sections of the two platforms including a concrete nameboard, some lamp posts and seats are preserved. The rest of the station site is now a housing estate and a car park

References

Further reading

Disused railway stations in East Sussex
Former London, Brighton and South Coast Railway stations
Railway stations in Great Britain opened in 1880
Railway stations in Great Britain closed in 1965
Beeching closures in England
Thomas Myres buildings
Wealden District